Warner Airport  is located  northeast of Warner, Alberta, Canada.

References

External links
Place to Fly on COPA's Places to Fly airport directory

Registered aerodromes in Alberta
Buildings and structures in the County of Warner No. 5